Sheila Armstrong (November 26, 1949 – May 18, 2010) was an American fencer. She competed in the women's individual and team foil events at the 1976 Summer Olympics. She also won the women's team foil bronze medal at the 1975 Pan American Games.

References

External links
 

1949 births
2010 deaths
American female foil fencers
Olympic fencers of the United States
Fencers at the 1976 Summer Olympics
People from Upland, California
Sportspeople from California
Pan American Games medalists in fencing
Pan American Games bronze medalists for the United States
Fencers at the 1975 Pan American Games
Medalists at the 1975 Pan American Games
21st-century American women